Meriden is an unincorporated community in Meriden Township, Steele County, Minnesota, United States, near Owatonna and Waseca.  The community is located along SW 92nd Avenue (County 18) near SW 13th Street.

History
Meriden was laid out in 1867. The community was named after Meriden, Connecticut, the native home of a first settler. The Meriden post office was discontinued in 1992.

References

Unincorporated communities in Steele County, Minnesota
Unincorporated communities in Minnesota